David Ronaldo Terkpertey  (born November 27, 1987, in Goma-Fetteh) is a Ghanaian football player who plays in Azerbaijan for FK Göyazan Qazax.

Career 
He left in 2008 the Feyenoord Academy and joined the Azerbaijani club FK Göyazan Qazax in July 2008.

Notes

External links 
 Player profile

1987 births
Living people
Ghanaian footballers
Expatriate footballers in Azerbaijan
Association football midfielders
Ghanaian expatriate footballers
West African Football Academy players